Ébéniste is a loanword (from French) for a cabinet-maker, particularly one who works in ebony.

Etymology and ambiguities
As opposed to ébéniste, the term menuisier denotes a woodcarver or chairmaker in French. The English equivalent for ébéniste, "ebonist", is not commonly used. Originally, an ébéniste was one who worked with ebony, a favoured luxury wood for mid-17th century Parisian cabinets, originating in imitation of elite furniture being made in Antwerp. The word is 17th-century in origin. Early Parisian ébénistes often came from the Low Countries themselves; an outstanding example is Pierre Gole, who worked at the Gobelins manufactory making cabinets and table tops veneered with marquetry, the traditional enrichment of ébénisterie, or "cabinet-work".

History
Ébénistes make case furniture, either  veneered or painted. Under Parisian guild regulations the application of painted varnishes, generically called vernis Martin, took place in separate workshops - sawdust being an enemy to freshly varnished surfaces. During the French Revolution the guilds in Paris and elsewhere were abolished (1791), and with them went all their regulations. As one result of this, Parisian chairmakers were able to produce veneered chairs - just as London furniture-makers, less stringently ruled, had been able to make since the production of the first chairs with splats shortly before 1720, in imitation of Chinese chairs.

Because of this amalgamation of trades, makers of chairs and of other seat furniture began to use veneering techniques, formerly the guarded privilege of ébénistes. This privilege became less distinct after the relaxation of guild rules of the Ancien Régime, and after the French Revolution's abolition of guilds in 1791. Seat furniture in the Empire style was often veneered with mahogany, and later in pale woods also.

From the mid-19th century onward, the two French trades, ébéniste and menuisier, often combined under the single roof of a "furnisher", and the craft began to make way for the industry. In Germany in Frommern a line of high polished production take up the ideas of the royal Hofebenist

From the mid-17th century through the 18th century, a notable number of ébénistes of German and Low Countries extraction were pre-eminent among Parisian furniture-makers, as the abbreviated list below suggests.

Some 17th- and 18th-century Parisian ébénistes

Joseph Baumhauer
Pierre-Antoine Bellange
Guillaume Beneman
André-Charles Boulle
Jacques-Philippe Carel
Martin Carlin
Mathieu Criaerd
Adrien Delorme
François-Honoré-Georges Jacob-Desmalter
Pierre Garnier
Antoine Gaudreau
Jean-Pierre Latz
Jean-François Leleu
Pierre Macret
Bernard Molitor
Roger Vandercruse Lacroix
Jean-François Oeben
Jean Oppenord
Jean-Henri Riesener
Bernard II van Risamburgh
Adam Weisweiler

Later French ébénistes
Henry Dasson
François Linke
Louis Majorelle
Émile-Jacques Ruhlmann

German Ebenists, or Kunstschreiner
 Rudolf Gambs,  St. Petersburg, Karlsruhe
 Wilhelm Kimbel
 Klinckerfuß Johannes (1770–1831) 1790 Württemberg
 Friedrich Wirth (Entrepreneur) (1806–1883) 1857 Württemberg
 Wilhelm Wirth (Entrepreneur) (1837–1917) Württemberg

Ébénistes outside France
 Gabriele Capello (Turin)
 Christopher Fuhrlohg (London)
 Mathäus Funk (Bern)
 Gerrit Jensen (London) 
 Georg Haupt (Stockholm)
 Pierre Langlois (London)
 Charles-Honoré Lannuier (New York)
 Abdelkader Saaidi (Casablanca)
 Pietro Piffetti (Turin)
 Abraham Roentgen (Neuwied)
 David Roentgen (Neuwied)
 Decon Brodie (Edinburgh)

See also
 List of furniture designers
 List of furniture types
 Woodworking

References

Pierre Verlet, 1963. Les Ébénistes Du XVIII Siècle Français
Pierre Verlet and Penelope Hunter-Stiebel, 1991. French Furniture of the Eighteenth Century
G. Janneau, 1975. Les ateliers parisiens d'ébénistes et de menuisiers aux XVIIe et XVIIIe siècles
Alexandre Pradère, 1990. French Furniture Makers: The Art of the Ébéniste from Louis XIV to the Revolution The standard modern text.
 French ébénistes of the 18th century Anticstore

Crafts
Cabinetmakers
Furniture-making
Woodworking